Kailash Chandra Mahindra, known as K. C. Mahindra (1894–1963), was an Indian industrialist, who co-founded Mahindra & Mohammed in 1945 which was later renamed as Mahindra & Mahindra in 1948, with Jagdish Chandra Mahindra

Early life and education
Kailash Chandra Mahindra, known to all as KC, was born in  a sikh family in 1894 in Ludhiana, Punjab, the second of nine children. When their father died at an early age, his older brother JC became head of the family, and KC his best friend and future business partner.

KC attended Government College, Lahore, where his scholastic aptitude shone through. At Cambridge, he earned Honours, played hockey, and took a keen interest in rowing. After graduating, he joined Messrs. Martin & Company, where he edited the monthly magazine INDIA and, briefly, the Hindustan Review.

Career
In 1942, KC was appointed Head of the Indian Purchasing Mission in the United States. Returning to India in 1945, he was appointed the Chairman of the Indian Coal Fields Committee of the Government of India and also of the Automobile and Tractor panel. His contribution to developing strategic coal policies and applying the latest methods of coal mining in India helped shape the industry, and his Coal Commission Report became a seminal document in the industry. During these years, he also wrote Sir Rajendranath Mookerjee's definitive biography.

Mahindra & Mahindra

In 1946, KC moved to Bombay to found Mahindra & Mohammed. Under his 13-year stewardship as chairman, Mahindra & Mahindra established itself as a major Indian industrial house in several sectors. A glittering career also saw KC serve as a Director of the Reserve Bank of India, Air India, and Hindustan Steel.

References

External links
 K.C. Mahindra Biography at Official Website of Mahindra & Mahindra
 Mahindra and an independent India began their rise together

1894 births
1963 deaths
Indian billionaires
Businesspeople from Ludhiana
Punjabi people
Mahindra Group
University of Mumbai alumni
20th-century Indian businesspeople
Indian industrialists
Indian founders of automobile manufacturers